Lijiao Station  is an interchange station on Line 3 of the Guangzhou Metro and Guangfo line that started operations on 28December 2006. It is located under Lijiao Village in the Haizhu District of Guangzhou. The Guangfo line was planned to open in 2010 but finally opened on 28December 2018.

Station layout

Exits

References

Railway stations in China opened in 2006
Guangzhou Metro stations in Haizhu District
Foshan Metro stations